Miller County may refer to several counties in the United States:

 Miller County, Arkansas 
 Miller County, Arkansas Territory, former county (1820–1838) of the former Arkansas Territory, now split between several states (Arkansas, southeastern Oklahoma and northeastern Texas)
 Miller County, Georgia 
 Miller County, Missouri